Burcot may refer to:
Burcot, Oxfordshire, England
Burcot, Worcestershire, England

See also
Burcote
Burcott (disambiguation)